Riverside Drive is one of the main roads in Windsor, Ontario, Canada,  travelling along the Detroit River, between its riverfront parks and high-rise office towers and apartment buildings. The road travels through Downtown, and towards the east end. The road is roughly 17.5 km in length, and is quite busy.

The road continues as Riverside Drive through the town of Tecumseh, Ontario, and through the village of St. Clair Beach, Ontario, where it ends at Brighton Road (Essex County Road 21).

For around 3 km of its length (from Rankin Avenue to Crawford Avenue (in front of CBC Windsor), there are bike lanes, with the Riverfront Bike Trail just to the north in the parkland.  Much of Windsor's most expensive residential real estate is housed on the waterfront side of Riverside Drive.

Sandwich Street 

The road was once named Sandwich Street, for the former community and now neighbourhood on the west end of Windsor. The road continues as Sandwich Street from the intersection with University Ave. West just past Huron Church Road, and continues past Ojibway Parkway to the Brighton Beach Power Plant, Black Oak Heritage Park, and the Brighton Beach neighbourhood of Windsor.

Riverside Drive Vista Project 
Throughout late 2005, and all of 2006, Windsor City Council has been trying to convert and widen the sidewalk along Riverside Drive (from Strabane Avenue to roughly Lauzon Road), to improve cycling access from the west side and downtown to the east side. The road is currently two lanes for most of its length, having either bike lanes or upscale residential properties that extend from the riverfront to the roadway.

The vista project will be a multimillion-dollar beautification project to plant trees, re-surface Riverside Drive, and re-surface sidewalks, possibly installing either bike lanes, or a bike trail along the road.

Residents who reside on the eastern portion of Riverside Drive are angry that the road is treated like a two-lane freeway, with  drivers speeding well above the posted speed limit of 50 km/h, and are calling for the City of Windsor to honour the promise made to them ten years ago to improve other roadways and divert the commuter traffic from their residential area.

See also 
 Ganatchio Trail
 Little River Extension
 Devonwood Bike Trail
 Riverside Drive Vista Project
 Bike Trails in the City of Windsor
 Trans-Canada Trail

References 
 Windsor Star
 Mapquest
 CHWI-TV 16/60 A-Channel Windsor

External links 
 Bike Trails at City of Windsor's website, CityWindsor.ca
 City of Windor BUMP (Bike User Master Plan)
 City of Windsor "Riverside Vista" Plans

County roads in Essex County, Ontario
Bike paths in Windsor, Ontario
Streets in Windsor, Ontario